MARTS or Marts may refer to:

People
 Marts (surname)

Places
 Marts, Lori, a village in Lori Province, Armenia
 Marts Peak, in the Sentinel Range of the Ellsworth Mountains, Antarctica

Other
 Malaysian Amateur Radio Transmitters' Society
 USS Marts (DE-174), a World War II U.S. Navy destroyer escort

See also
 Mart (disambiguation)
 Marte (disambiguation)
 Martes (disambiguation)